Chalderaz-e Gholamali (also Romanized as Chālderāz-e Gholāmʿalī) is a village in Barez Rural District, Manj District, Lordegan County, Chaharmahal and Bakhtiari Province, Iran. At the 2006 census, its population was 115, in 20 families.

References 

Populated places in Lordegan County